Northcutt may refer to:

Northcutt (surname)
Dennis Northcutt (born 1977), American football wide receiver and punt returner
Frances 'Poppy' Northcutt (born 1943), American 'computress' for NASA's Apollo Project and attorney specializing in women's rights
Glenn Northcutt, leader in comparative vertebrate neurobiology and evolutionary neuroscience
Kevin Northcutt (born 1973), American professional wrestler
Sage Northcutt (born 1996), American mixed martial artist
Wendy Northcutt (born 1963), the creator of the Darwinawards.com website and author of five books on the Darwin Awards

See also
Northcut, Missouri, a community in the United States
Northcutt-Carter Route (Hallett Peak), popular technical climbing route on Hallett Peak in Colorado's Rocky Mountain National Park